Acacia obtecta is a shrub of the genus Acacia and the subgenus Plurinerves that is endemic to a small area in south western Australia.

Description
Like most species of Acacia it has phyllodes rather than true leaves. It blooms from August to October and produces yellow flowers. The simple inflorescences appear singly or in groups of up to four and have spherical flower-heads with a diameter of about  containing 20 to 36 golden coloured flowers. Following flowering chartaceous seed pods form that resemble a string of beads.

Taxonomy
The species was first formally described by the botanists Joseph Maiden and William Blakely in 1927 as a part of the work Descriptions of fifty new species and six varieties of western and northern Australian Acacias, and notes on four other species as published in the Journal of the Royal Society of Western Australia. It was reclassified as Racosperma obtectum by Leslie Pedley in 2003 then transferred back to genus Acacia in 2006.
The shrub is most closely related to Acacia speckii and also resembles Acacia heteroclita, and is superficially similar in appearance to Acacia websteri which belongs to subgenus Juliflorae''.

Distribution
It is native to an area in the Wheatbelt and Goldfields-Esperance regions of Western Australia where it is commonly found on flat areas growing in sandy loam or clay or loamy soils. The range of the shrub is limited to an area between Paynes Find in the north to Wubin in the south to around Kununoppin in the east with a population also found around Lake Barlee.

See also
List of Acacia species

References

obtecta
Acacias of Western Australia
Taxa named by Joseph Maiden
Taxa named by William Blakely
Plants described in 1927